is a Japanese manga by Kenichi Sakura (佐倉 ケンイチ Sakura Ken'ichi) published by Shueisha and serialized in the manga magazine Monthly Shōnen Jump. Publication ended on January 5, 2006, with a total of 14 volumes. Dragon Drive follows lazy junior high school student Reiji Ozora who routinely gives up on everything he starts and is terrible at his school work. Tired of seeing him give up at everything and continue to perform so poorly at school, his childhood friend Maiko Yukino shows Reiji the virtual reality game called Dragon Drive. It is a fighting game in which players and their dragon partners face off within a virtual reality city. Reiji's general lazy personality and lackluster school performances lead him to gain a seemingly equally lazy small dragon whom he calls Chibi. Only later do both of their true strengths show as Chibi, despite being small and sleeping in his first appearance, turns out to be the rarest dragon in the game, a discovery which leads Reiji and his friends to another world called Rikyu.

An anime adaptation by Madhouse directed by Toshifumi Kawase and written by Toshiki Inoue aired on TV Tokyo from July 4, 2002 to March 27, 2003 for a total of 38 episodes. The franchise also spawned three video games, being Dragon Drive: Tactics Break for the PlayStation, Dragon Drive: World D Break for the Game Boy Advance, and Dragon Drive: D-Masters Shot on GameCube.

In North America, Viz Media acquired the rights to distribute the Dragon Drive manga and the anime series was released by Bandai Entertainment.

Plot
Reiji Ozora is a chronic quitter who never completes what's assigned or handed to him, but one day Maiko, his closest friend, walks him to a local arcade where the latest game craze is happening: Dragon Drive. After meeting Chibi, a seemingly meek dragon, Reiji wants to make himself and Chibi stronger. To obtain this strength, both are taken to a secret training room in the "D-Zone", the same room Maiko and Daisuke snuck in earlier upon seeing a strange dragon appearing in the sky. The dragon suddenly absorbs them into another Earth known as Rikyu, where they meet Meguru, a girl who was also transported to Rikyu. There, the elder of the village reveals the intentions RI-ON, the group behind Dragon Drive, have trying to obtain the Jinryuuseki stone, which grants its welder the power to control all dragons in Rikyu.

RI-ON conspires the children to be used as their soldiers. Should they succeed, both Rikyu and Earth will be destroyed. This is where Chibi, who is actually the legendary dragon Senkoukura, the savior of Rikyu, and Reiji become important to both worlds. In order to protect both worlds, Reiji and Chibi must enter the Dragonic Heaven tournament, where RI-ON has already sent for an agent to enter, and win the Jinryuuseki stone. Remembering that Agent L is an employee of RI-ON, the one who helped him through his first few games, Reiji is polarized between both sides, believing the elder and Meguru's testimonies while skeptical of the alleged foul intentions of Agent L or the employees of RI-ON. In the end, he doesn't truly chose either side but instead resolves to fight in order to learn the truth about RI-ON, Rikyu and Dragon Drive.

Several years later progress and Maiko's little brother, Takumi, receives severe warnings to never play Dragon Drive. One day while hiding from a storm, he obtains his first set of cards from a strange old man he meets. After receiving his cards, Takumi finds his new calling by showing strong determination and the mysterious ability to talk to dragons, forming a strong friendship with his strongest dragon Raikoo, as he works to help him gain his memories back.

After a dream one night, Takumi discovers his dragon is one in ninety-nine special dragon cards, all of which are called Raikoo, that were given to certain players of the game called Raikoo masters. Soon a group going by the name of RI-IN enters the scene, and all the players, with the exception of the ones in the gaming stores vanish, leaving the world in ruins and dragons in their place. Left behind in this rapidly changing world, Takumi, Raikoo, and their new friends must rally the remaining Raikoo masters together in hopes of restoring Earth and bringing the people back. In order to save the world, Rikyu and Earth join to become one, and the dragons disappear completely to become spirits. Twenty-seven years later, the game resurfaces to a new audience while Reiji, Takumi, and their friends live out fruitful lives.

Cast

References

External links

Official Shueisha website 
Official Madhouse website 
Official TV Tokyo website 
Dragon Drive at Carddas 

2001 manga
2002 anime television series debuts
2002 Japanese television series debuts
2003 Japanese television series endings
Action anime and manga
Bandai Entertainment anime titles
Bandai Visual
Dragons in popular culture
Fantasy anime and manga
Madhouse (company)
Shōnen manga
Shueisha manga
TV Tokyo original programming
Video games developed in Japan
Viz Media manga